1. FC Phönix Lübeck is a German association football club from the city of Lübeck, Schleswig-Holstein. The club has, historically, played at highest level in Germany, with the last stint of this coming from 1957 to 1960 in the tier one Oberliga Nord. After the introduction of the Bundesliga in 1963 Phönix played in the tier two Regionalliga Nord from 1967 to 1974 but has since fallen to regional amateur level.

Phönix also made two appearances in the DFB-Pokal, the German Cup, in 1938 and 1976.

History
LBV Phönix was formed in 1903 but the current club, 1. FC Phönix Lübeck, was established when the football department split from the mother club in 1971.

In post-First World War football the club experienced a first successful era from 1927 to 1930 when it advanced to the qualifying rounds of the Northern German football championship three consecutive times. It only made it to the first round proper once however, in 1930, where the club lost 5–2 to Hamburger SV.

The club played in the tier one Gauliga Nordmark from 1935 to 1938, when it was relegated again. It competed in the 1938 Tschammerpokal but lost 1–0 to Blau-Weiß 90 Berlin in the final qualifying round.

After the Second World War the club entered the tier two Landesliga Schleswig-Holstein where it consistently finished in top five of the league. It competed there, at times, with local rival VfB Lübeck and a runners-up finish behind the latter in 1957 took the team up to the Oberliga for the first time. Phönix played in the Oberliga Nord from 1957 to 1960 as a lower table side and was relegated again after three seasons. Back in what was now the Amateurliga Schleswig-Holstein the club dropped to the third tier in 1963 when the Bundesliga and the Regionalligas below were established. It mostly remained a top side and won the league in 1966–67.

Phönix played in the Regionalliga Nord from 1967 to 1974, when the league was disbanded in favor of the new 2. Bundesliga. In its seven Regionalliga seasons the club twice finished sixth as its best result but, even without the disbanding of the league, would have been relegated from the Regionalliga in 1974 as it finished last in that season.

Phönix became a founding member of the new tier three Oberliga Nord but was relegated after only one season in 1975. The club returned for just one more season to the league in 1978–79 but suffered immediate relegation again. A Schleswig-Holstein Cup win in 1976 qualified the club for the first round of the 1976–77 DFB-Pokal, where it lost 2–0 to Eintracht Bad Kreuznach.

An era of lower table finishes in what was now the Verbandsliga Schleswig-Holstein followed from 1979 onwards. After 1985 the club's results improved again but, after finishing last in the league in 1988–89, it was relegated from the top tier in Schleswig-Holstein for the first time in post-war football. It returned to the Verbandsliga in 1993 and, coming fifth, qualified for the new Oberliga Hamburg/Schleswig-Holstein in 1994.

Phönix became a founding member of the tier four Oberliga Hamburg/Schleswig-Holstein and finished fifth in its first season there but was relegated again in 1997. It briefly returned for a season in 1998–99 before dropping back down, withdrawing from the Oberliga to the tier seven Bezirksliga.

Since then the club has been fluctuating between the sixth and the seventh tier, earning promotion back to the tier six Verbandsliga Süd-Ost in 2015. In 2017 it qualified for the new tier-six Landesliga.

Following two promotions in 2019 and 2020 the club entered the Regionalliga Nord in 2020. This was the first appearance in the 4th tier since 1999.

Season to season 
The recent season-by-season performance of the club:

 With the introduction of the Regionalligas in 1994 and the 3. Liga in 2008 as the new third tier, below the 2. Bundesliga, all leagues below dropped one tier. With the introduction of the Landesligas as the new sixth tier, above the Verbandsligas, all leagues below further dropped one tier. The Verbandsliga Süd-Ost was renamed Verbandsliga Süd.

Players

Current squad

Former players 
The following players have been elected into the club's hall of fame:
 Hans Joachim Aido
 Heiko Berner
 Siegfried Beyer
 Wolfgang Bordel
 Otto Hartz
 Lothar Hinrichs
 Hans-Joachim Ihde
 Peter Nogly
 Jürgen Stars
 Gregor Wintersteller

Honours 
 Schleswig-Holstein-Liga: 1966–67, 1977–78
 Kreisliga Lübeck: 2011–12, 2014–15
 Schleswig-Holstein Cup: 1975–76

References

External links
 
1. FC Phönix Lübeck at worldfootball.net 

 
Football clubs in Germany
Football clubs in Schleswig-Holstein
Association football clubs established in 1903
1903 establishments in Germany
Phonix